Joe Gomez may refer to:

 Joe Gomez (wrestler) (born 1973), American professional wrestler
 Joe Gomez (footballer) (born 1997), English footballer